Flight 182 may refer to:

 PSA Flight 182, collided on 25 September 1978 with Cessna skyhawk in North Park, San Diego, California
 Air India Flight 182, exploded on 23 June 1985 by a terrorist bombing off the coast of Ireland
 Sriwijaya Air Flight 182, crashed on 9 January 2021 in the Java Sea

0182